The 33rd Hong Kong Awards ceremony, honored the best films of 2013 and took place on 13 April 2014 at Hong Kong Cultural Center, Kowloon, Hong Kong. The ceremony was hosted by Teresa Mo, Gordon Lam and Ronald Cheng, during the ceremony awards are presented in 19 categories and 1 Lifetime Achievement Award.

Awards
Winners are listed first, highlighted in boldface, and indicated with a double dagger.

References

2014
2014 film awards
2014 in Hong Kong
Hong